Wilhelm Wattenbach (22 September 181920 September 1897), was a German historian.

He was born at Rantzau in Holstein.  He studied philology at the universities of Bonn, Göttingen and Berlin, and in 1843 he began to work upon the Monumenta Germaniae Historica. In 1855 he was appointed archivist at Breslau; in 1862 he became a professor of history at Heidelberg, and ten years later a professor at Berlin, where he was a member of the directing body of the Monumenta Germaniae Historica and a member of the Academy. He died at Frankfurt.

According to the Encyclopædia Britannica Eleventh Edition, Wattenbach was distinguished by his thorough knowledge of the chronicles and other original documents of the Middle Ages, and his most valuable work was done in this field.

Works
Deutschlands Geschichtsquellen im Mittelalter bis zur Mitte des XIII Jahrhunderts (1858), his principal book, a guide to the sources of the history of Germany in the Middle Ages, several editions. 1893 ed.
Anleitung zur lateinischen Paläographie (Leipzig, 1869, and again 1886)
Das Schriftwesen im Mittelalter (Leipzig, 1871, and again 1896)
Beiträge zur Geschichte der christlichen Kirche in Böhmen und Mähren (Vienna, 1849)
Geschichte des römischen Papsttums (Berlin, 1876)
Anleitung zur griechischen Paläographie (Leipzig, 1867, and again 1895).

References

1819 births
1897 deaths
19th-century German historians
19th-century German male writers
German palaeographers
People from the Duchy of Holstein
University of Bonn alumni
German male non-fiction writers
Members of the Göttingen Academy of Sciences and Humanities